Hebeloma aestivale is a species of mushroom in the family Hymenogastraceae. It was originally described from Denmark. It is in the Velutipes section of the genus. H. aestivale has also been described in the United Kingdom, where it is one of the more commonly documented Hebeloma species.

Description
Hebeloma aestivale is characterised by elongated, slightly clubbed cheilocystidia and dextrinoid spores where the outer perispore layer becomes loose.

See also
List of Hebeloma species

References

aestivale
Fungi described in 1995
Fungi of Europe